The Disappointment Bay Formation is a geologic formation in Nunavut, extending from Ellesmere Island in the east to Bathurst Island in the west. It preserves fossils dating back to the Devonian period, primarily of invertebrates.

Fossil Content

Fish
Vertebrate remains are rare in this formation. Indeterminate spine fragments are found throughout the Lowther Island off-reef limestones but are rare. A 2-centimeter wide fragment found in the 2 m-level ammonoid bed of Young Island may represent a cyathaspidid.

Invertebrates

Plants and algae

See also

 List of fossiliferous stratigraphic units in Nunavut

References

 

Devonian Nunavut
Devonian southern paleotropical deposits